Lourdes Valentina Figuera Morales (born 16 June 2000) is a Venezuelan model and beauty queen who represented Venezuela at Miss Grand International 2019 where she won the title. She is the first Venezuelan woman to win the Miss Grand International title.

Personal life
Figuera was born in Puerto La Cruz, Venezuela on June 16, 2000 with her twin sister, Verónica. She is a model and also an Architecture student at Santiago Mariño Polytechnic University Institute in Puerto La Cruz.

Pageantry

El Concurso by Osmel Sousa 2018 
In 2018, Figuera and her twin sister participated in El Concurso by Osmel Sousa; a Venezuelan beauty contest and reality show. Figuera won the competition and rose to Miss Grand International 2019 as a contestant.

Miss Grand International 2019
Figuera represented Venezuela in Miss Grand International 2019 and won the competition, held on 25 October 2019 at the Poliedro de Caracas in Caracas, Venezuela, when she was crowned by outgoing titleholder Miss Grand International 2018, Clara Sosa of Paraguay. 

On March 27, 2021, in Bangkok, Thailand, Figuera crowned Abena Appiah from the United States as her successor.

References

External links

Miss Grand International winners
2000 births
Living people
Venezuelan twins
Venezuelan beauty pageant winners
Venezuelan female models
People from Puerto la Cruz